Saturn LX, provisionally known as S/2004 S 29, is a natural satellite of Saturn and a member of the Inuit group. Its discovery was announced by Scott S. Sheppard, David C. Jewitt, and Jan Kleyna on October 7, 2019 from observations taken between December 12, 2004 and January 17, 2007. It was given its permanent designation in August 2021.

Saturn LX is about 4 kilometres in diameter, and orbits Saturn at an average distance of 16.981 Gm in 826.44 days, at an inclination of 45.1° to the ecliptic, with an eccentricity of 0.440.

References

Inuit group
Irregular satellites
Moons of Saturn
Discoveries by Scott S. Sheppard
Astronomical objects discovered in 2019
Moons with a prograde orbit